The 88th Tour of Flanders bicycle race in Belgium was held on 4 April 2004. It was the second leg of the UCI Road World Cup. German Steffen Wesemann won the monument classic ahead of Belgians Leif Hoste and Dave Bruylandts.

Race Overview
American George Hincapie tried to spark a winning move on the Leberg. Frustrated, he found nobody to help him, particularly as Van Petegem's Lotto team had two men further up the road. Bruylandts was the next to give it a go, taking Serguei Ivanov with him as Michael Boogerd leapt across to catch the tail end of the move. They were soon caught by the group of favourites, but the attack signaled the coming of the crucial point in the race, with the often decisive climbs of the Tenbosse, the Muur and Bosberg still to come.

Van Petegem tried to go clear on the paved rise of the Tenbosse, but Bettini wouldn't let him go. By this point eight men were still away up front, but their advantage dwindled quickly as the more than 200 kilometres covered seemed to do nothing to blunt the speed of the peloton. The leaders were caught just before Geraardsbergen and the showdown was on the Muur with a big group of heavy-hitters still together.

The expected attacks by Van Petegem, Vandenbroucke, and Museeuw didn't materialize, leaving Wesemann and Bruylandts to spark the winning escape at the top of the Muur with Hoste in tow. Hoste, who had been away in some fashion all day long, avoided taking any pulls as the trio sped toward Meerbeke. The other two let him sit on, preferring to take their own chances rather than be caught up in a premature tactical battle. Hoste did close the gap when Bruylandts put in a last-kilometre attack, but it only served to set up the powerful Wesemann to take the sprint and claim his first ever World Cup victory.

On the day of this race, cycling legend and record holder for participations in the Tour of Flanders, Briek Schotte died at the age of 84. He also won the race twice and made the podium on six other occasions.

Top 20 finishers
 Steffen Wesemann (Ger) T-Mobile Team                           6.39.00 (38.65 km/h)
 Leif Hoste (Bel) Lotto–Domo                                           
 Dave Bruylandts (Bel) Chocolade Jacques–Wincor Nixdorf                
 Léon van Bon (Ned) Lotto–Domo                                     0.28
 Erik Dekker (Ned) Rabobank                                            
 Andreas Klier (Ger) T-Mobile Team                                     
 Rolf Aldag (Ger) T-Mobile Team                                    1.09
 Frank Høj (Den) Team CSC                                          1.16
 Paolo Bettini (Ita) Quick.Step–Davitamon                              
 George Hincapie (USA) US Postal Service presented by Berry Floor     
 Thierry Marichal (Bel) Lotto–Domo                                    
 Juan Antonio Flecha Giannoni (Spa) Fassa Bortolo                 1.17
 Laurent Brochard (Fra) AG2r Prévoyance                           1.30
 Jörg Ludewig (Ger) Saeco                                         1.38
 Johan Museeuw (Bel) Quick.Step–Davitamon                             
 Peter Van Petegem (Bel) Lotto–Domo                                   
 Serguei Ivanov (Rus) T-Mobile Team                                   
 Xavier Florencio (Spa) Relax–Bodysol                           
 Roberto Petito (Ita) Fassa Bortolo                                   
 Michael Boogerd (Ned) Rabobank                                       
 Stijn Devolder (Bel) US Postal Service presented by Berry Floor

External links
Race website
Cycling News race coverage of 2004 Tour of Flanders

References

Ronde van Vlaanderen
2004 Ronde van Vlaanderen
Tuor of Flanders
April 2004 sports events in Europe
2004 in road cycling